Haunted (also released as The Haunted) is a 1977 American independent horror film written and directed by Michael DeGaetano and starring Aldo Ray, Virginia Mayo, and Ann Michelle.

Plot

The story follows the descendants of those who accused a witch in Arizona during the Civil War. They are subjected to inexplicable deaths.

Cast

Production
Haunted was filmed on location in Arizona over a period of 24 days on a budget of $250,000. According to writer-director De Gaetano, budgeting issues necessitated that portions of the script be un-filmed, resulting in "a good deal of the philosophical depth of the film" disappearing.

Release
Haunted was released theatrically in the United States, beginning on March 4, 1977 in Florence, South Carolina. Contemporaneous newspaper sources show had a limited engagement screening in Salem, Oregon in late-March 1977.

In the United States, the film was released on VHS under the title The Haunted on March 20, 1992.

References

1977 films
1977 independent films
1970s supernatural horror films
1970s Western (genre) horror films
American supernatural horror films
American Western (genre) horror films
Films about curses
Films about witchcraft
Films set in Arizona
Films shot in Arizona
American Civil War films
1970s English-language films
1970s American films